The Pugo–Rosario Road is a major road in La Union that connects from MacArthur Highway in Rosario to the Aspiras–Palispis Highway in Pugo. It is the alternative route to Marcos Highway for motorists going to Pugo and Baguio.

The road forms part of National Route 209 (N209) of the Philippine highway network.

Intersections

See also
 Highways in the Philippines

References

Roads in La Union